Lakota Department is a department of Lôh-Djiboua Region in Gôh-Djiboua District, Ivory Coast. In 2021, its population was 334,235 and its seat is the settlement of Lakota. The sub-prefectures of the department are Djidji, Gagoré, Goudouko, Lakota, Niambézaaria, and Zikisso.

Lakota Department was created in 1980 as a split-off from Divo Department. In 1997, regions were introduced as new first-level subdivisions of Ivory Coast; as a result, all departments were converted into second-level subdivisions. Lakota Department was included in Sud-Bandama Region.

In 2011, districts were introduced as new first-level subdivisions of Ivory Coast. At the same time, regions were reorganised and became second-level subdivisions and all departments were converted into third-level subdivisions. At this time, Lakota Department became part of Lôh-Djiboua Region in Gôh-Djiboua District.

Notes

Departments of Lôh-Djiboua
1980 establishments in Ivory Coast
States and territories established in 1980